Marie-Antoinette Oda Katoto (born 1 November 1998) is a French professional footballer who plays as a striker for Division 1 Féminine club Paris Saint-Germain and the France national team. A youth academy graduate of Paris Saint-Germain, she became the club's all-time top scorer in February 2022 at the age of 23.

Club career
Katoto started her youth career with Colombes FFC in 2005. She joined Paris Saint-Germain Academy in 2011. She went on to score 27 goals from 26 matches for youth teams of the club and helped her side to win the Championnat de France National Féminine U19 title in 2016.

Katoto made her senior team debut on 26 April 2015 against VfL Wolfsburg in the second leg of 2014–15 UEFA Women's Champions League semi-finals. She was given a league debut by manager Farid Benstiti during the following week's 5–0 win over Rodez. She played the whole 90 minutes and netted a goal.

Katoto scored 21 goals during 2017–18 Division 1 Féminine season, finishing as second highest goalscorer behind eventual Ballon d'Or Féminin winner Ada Hegerberg. On 31 May 2018, she helped her side to win the 2017–18 Coupe de France féminine final against six-time defending champions Lyon by scoring the only goal in the match.

On 5 February 2022, Katoto scored a brace in a league match against Guingamp and surpassed Marie-Laure Delie to become team's all-time top scorer.

International career

Youth
Katoto has represented France at different youth levels, accumulating 35 caps and 24 goals. She was part of French team which won the 2016 UEFA Women's Under-19 Championship. She finished the tournament as top scorer with six goals, and was selected as the best player. She was also part of the team which reached semi-finals of 2018 FIFA U-20 Women's World Cup.

Senior
Katoto made her senior team debut on 10 November 2018 in a 3–1 friendly win over Brazil. She came on as a substitute, replacing Delphine Cascarino at the 66th minute. She scored her first international goal on 19 January 2019 in a 3–1 friendly win over the United States. In the run up to the match, France's coach Corinne Diacre had publicly criticised the attitude and application of Katoto.

In May 2019, Diacre left Katoto out of the 23-player squad for the 2019 FIFA Women's World Cup, which was hosted by France. The decision caused widespread surprise as Katoto was the top scorer of French league previous season. Diacre however defended her decision by stating that: "It was a difficult choice, but I made it and I stand by it. It's certain that if we don’t win the World Cup, I will be reproached for it." Despite this, France were knocked out in quarter-finals by the United States, who went on to defend their title.

On 17 September 2021, Katoto scored her first hat-trick for national team in a 10–0 win against Greece. During France's group stage match against Belgium at UEFA Women's Euro 2022, Katoto suffered a "serious" knee injury that ruled her out for the rest of the competition. On 24 February 2023 she announced she would no longer play for the national team after captain Wendie Renard said she would step down to save her mental health. Katoto said she wanted changes to be made to the way the team was managed.

Personal life
Born in France, Katoto is of DR Congolese descent.

Career statistics

Club

International

Scores and results list France's goal tally first, score column indicates score after each Katoto goal.

Honours
Paris Saint-Germain
 Division 1 Féminine: 2020–21
 Coupe de France: 2017–18, 2021–22; runner-up: 2016–17, 2019–20
 UEFA Women's Champions League runner-up: 2014–15, 2016–17

France U19
 UEFA Women's Under-19 Championship: 2016

Individual
 UEFA Women's Under-19 Championship Player of the Tournament: 2016
 UEFA Women's Champions League Team of the Season: 2021–22
 UEFA Women's Under-19 Championship Team of the Tournament: 2016
 UEFA Women's Under-19 Championship top scorer: 2016
 Trophées UNFP du football Player of the Year: 2021–22
 Trophées FFF D1 Féminine - Best Player: 2021–2022
 Trophées UNFP du football Young Player of the Year: 2017–2018, 2018–2019
 Trophées FFF D1 Féminine - Best Young Player: 2017–2018, 2018–2019
 Trophées UNFP du football Team of the Year: 2020–21, 2021–22
 Trophées FFF D1 Féminine - Team of the Season: 2017–2018, 2018–2019, 2020–2021, 2021–2022
 Division 1 Féminine top scorer: 2018–19, 2019–20, 2021–22
 Coupe de France top scorer: 2021–22
 Division 1 Féminine Player of the Month: November 2020, December 2020, January 2022

References

External links

 
 
 Player profile at Paris Saint-Germain

1998 births
Living people
Sportspeople from Colombes
Footballers from Hauts-de-Seine
Women's association football forwards
French women's footballers
France women's international footballers
Paris Saint-Germain Féminine players
Division 1 Féminine players
Black French sportspeople
French sportspeople of Democratic Republic of the Congo descent
France women's youth international footballers
UEFA Women's Euro 2022 players